Kosinov is a Russian masculine surname, its feminine counterpart is Kosinova. Notable people with the surname include:

Artyom Kosinov (born 1986), Kazakh runner
Olexandr Kosinov (born 1983), Ukrainian Paralympic judoka

 Also
 Kosinov (rural locality), a khutor in Republic of Adygea, Russia
 Kosinov, Kursk Oblast, a khutor in Oboyansky District of Kursk Oblast, Russia

Russian-language surnames